Southern Police  is an Ethiopian football club based in Sidama Zone in the Southern Nations, Nationalities, and Peoples' Region.  The club played in the Ethiopian Premier League.

Currently the team play in Ethiopian Premier League.

Stadium
Their home stadium is Addis Ababa Stadium in Addis Ababa.
It has a capacity of 34,000.

League participations
Ethiopian Premier League: ?-2011Ethiopian Second Division: 2011–

References

External links
RSSF
Stadium

Football clubs in Ethiopia
Police association football clubs in Ethiopia